Donald J. Carty,  (born July 23, 1946) is a Canadian-American businessman who serves as chairman of Porter Airlines. Carty also serves as a director of VMWare, Hawaiian Airlines and Betterez. He was previously chairman and chief executive officer (CEO) of AMR Corporation, the parent company of American Airlines, from 1998 to 2003. He is the past Chairman of Virgin America and E-Rewards, Inc. (now known as Dynata). Carty is also a past director of Dell, CN Rail, Sears, Placer Dome, Barrick Gold, CHC Helicopters, Brinker International, Talisman Energy, EMC Corporation (now known as Dell EMC), and Gluskin Sheff. In January 2007, Carty became the Vice Chairman and chief financial officer of Dell.  On June 13, 2008, Carty retired from day-to-day operations, but stayed on as a director. He is a past chairman of Big Brothers Big Sisters of America, a former member of the Board of Trustees of both Southern Methodist University and Queen's University and of the board of directors of the Dallas Center for the Performing Arts Foundation and the Dallas Theater Center. He currently serves on the Executive Board of the SMU Cox School of Business.

Biography 
Born in Toronto, Ontario, on July 23, 1946, Carty attended Queen's University and Harvard Business School. He took US citizenship in the early 1980s. He worked for Air Canada and the Canadian Pacific Railway before joining American, although he served as CEO for CP Air from 1985 to 1987.  At American, he served as controller, and later as executive vice president for finance and planning under CEO Robert Crandall, before becoming CEO of AMR himself in 1998.

In April 2003, in the long wake of the September 11 attacks and facing an industry beset by terrorism and hard economic times, Carty and his executive board were forced to strike a cost-cutting deal with American's labor unions, intended to mitigate AMR's upcoming $1 billion first-quarter loss.  The deal—which was at the time the largest corporate restructuring outside of bankruptcy in American history—almost unraveled several days later, when unions learned that  at the same time that American Airlines was demanding $1.6 billion in concessions from its unionized employees, the company gave $40 million in perks to its top executives, Although many other airlines had similar retention bonus arrangements, in order to facilitate a final agreement between the company and the unions, Carty voluntarily stepped down. He was replaced as CEO by Gerard Arpey, and as chairman by Edward A. Brennan.

Carty was appointed as Chairman of Virgin America on February 6, 2006. On February 2 of that year, Toronto-based Porter Airlines, in the process of starting up a regional service out of the downtown Toronto island airport, announced that Carty would simultaneously serve as its chairman. Carty has served on Hawaiian Airlines Board of Directors three times; 2004-2007, 2008-2011, and currently since 2016.

In 1999, Board Alert named him one of the year’s Outstanding Directors. In 2002, he was made an Officer of the Order of Canada. In September 2002, Carty was appointed by President Bush to the National Infrastructure Advisory Council where he served until the summer of 2005.  He is a recipient of an Honorary Doctor of Law from Queen’s University.

Family Life 
Carty was in born in Toronto, growing up in Toronto and Montreal, with 4 brothers and a sister. In 1969, he met Sharon Louise Smith in Boston while at Harvard, and they married in 1970. They had three children while living in Montreal, Michael Patrick, Catherine Rebecca, and William Robert Douglas. Don and Sharon were divorced in 1994.

He was remarried in 1998 in Dallas to Eva Ana Maria Rodriguez. They have two children, Michael Malin Payne and Donald John Jr. They currently live in Dallas, Texas, and spend time in Newport Beach, California, and on a lake in Greater Madawaska, Ontario.

References

External links

1946 births
Living people
American Airlines people
Barrick Gold
Canadian airline chief executives
Dell people
Harvard Business School alumni
Queen's University at Kingston alumni
Officers of the Order of Canada
Businesspeople from Toronto
Sears Holdings people
Chief financial officers
Hawaiian Airlines people